Vasiljevići may refer to:
 Vasiljevići, Nikšić, Montenegro
 Vasiljevići (Ivanjica), Serbia